Bootle is a town within the Metropolitan Borough of Sefton near Liverpool, England.

Bootle may also refer to:

 Associated with the town of Bootle:
 Bootle F.C., a football club
 Bootle F.C. (1879), a football club
 Bootle (UK Parliament constituency)
 HMS Bootle, two ships of the Royal Navy

Other uses:
 Bootle, Cumbria, England, a village
 William Augustus Bootle (1902–2005), an American judge
 Dicaprio Bootle (born 1997), American football player
 Roger Bootle, a British economist and a weekly columnist for the Daily Telegraph